The following is a partial list of products that Mark of the Unicorn (MOTU) supplies to the public. Some of these are no longer in production.

Software
 Cross-platform (Mac & Windows)
 Digital Performer
 MachFive
 MOTU Symphonic Instrument
 MOTU Ethno Instrument
 Electric Keys
 BPM
 FreeStyle
 Unisyn
 Mac
 MX4
 Volta
 AudioDesk
 FreeMIDI
 Mosaic
 Performer
 WaveEdit
 Professional Composer
 Mouse Stampede
 MS-DOS
 PC/InterComm (VT100 terminal emulator)
 Scribble (text formatter; simplified version of Scribe)
 MINCE (MINCE Is Not Complete Emacs) (early 1980s)
 Final Word word processor (became Borland Sprint circa 1988; combined Mince and Scribble into one product)
 Amiga & Atari ST
 Hex (video game)

Audio interfaces

 Thunderbolt 
 828X
 828es
 1248
 8M
 8pre-es
 16A
 112D
 8A
 624
 FireWire 
 Traveler-mk3
 Traveler
 AudioExpress
 Ultralite-mk3
 Ultralite
 4pre
 828mk3
 828mkII
 828
 896mk3
 896HD
 896
 8pre
 USB 
 Ultralite-mk3 hybrid
 828mkII
 828X
 MicroBook
 MicroBook II
 24Ai
 24Ao
 Monitor 8
 Stage-B16
 Ultralite AVB
 Ultralite-mk4
624
M2
M4
UltraLite-mk5
 PCI 
 2408mk3
 24I/O
 HD192
 2408mkII
 1296
 24i
 308
 1224
 2408
 NuBus
 Digital Waveboard
AVB-TSN networking
1248
8M
16A
24Ai
24Ao
Monitor 8
112D
Stage-B16
UltraLite AVB
624
8A
M64
8D
LP32
828es
8pre-es
AVB Switch

MIDI interfaces
 USB 
 MIDI Timepiece AV
 MIDI Express XT
 Micro Express
 Express 128
 Micro Lite
 Fastlane (2x2)
 Parallel 
 MIDI Timepiece AV
 MIDI Express XT
 Micro Express
 PC-MIDI Flyer 
 Pocket Express
 MIDI Express PC Notebook
 MIDI Express PC
 Serial
 MIDI Timepiece AV
 MIDI Express XT
 Micro Express
 Fastlane (1x3)
 Pocket Express
 MIDI Express
 MIDI Timepiece II 
 MIDI Timepiece

Video interfaces
 HD Express
 HDX-SDI
 V4HD
 V3HD

Synchronizers
 Digital Timepiece
 Video Timepiece

Other
 MIDI Mixer 7s
 Hex game for the Atari ST and Amiga computers (released in 1985)

References

External links

MIDI
Technology-related lists
Music-related lists